David James Moore (born January 15, 1995) is an American football wide receiver who is a free agent. He played college football at East Central University and was originally selected by the Seattle Seahawks in the seventh round of the 2017 NFL draft. He also previously played for the Denver Broncos and Green Bay Packers.

Early years
Moore attended and played high school football at Gainesville High School. As a senior, he recorded forty receptions for 700 yards and twelve touchdowns.

College career
Moore played college football in Division II at East Central University in Ada, Oklahoma.

Legal troubles

Marijuana and Weapons Charges
On July 3rd, 2022 Moore was found to have passed out in a Ford F250 pickup truck while in a Taco Bell drive-through, in his hometown of Gainesville. Police claimed to have smelled marijuana and searched the vehicle. The search uncovered THC edibles and 3 pistols. Moore was booked on July 4th and released after posting a $5000 bail for the marijuana possession and weapons charges.

Professional career

Seattle Seahawks
In the 2017 NFL Draft, Moore was selected by the Seattle Seahawks in the seventh round, 226th overall. Two weeks later on May 12, the Seahawks signed him to a four-year, $2.48 million contract that included a signing bonus of $87,365. Moore was waived on September 2, and assigned to the practice squad the next day. He was promoted to the Seahawks' active roster on November 22, 2017.

Against the Arizona Cardinals in Week 4 of the 2018 season, Moore recorded his first two professional receptions for 39 total yards. In the following game against the Los Angeles Rams, he had three receptions for 38 yards and his first two professional receiving touchdowns. In Weeks 6 and 8, he recorded a receiving touchdown against the Oakland Raiders and Detroit Lions. In Week 12, he had his first game going over the century mark with 103 yards and a touchdown against the Carolina Panthers. Moore finished the 2018 season with 26 receptions for 445 receiving yards and five receiving touchdowns.

In the 2019 season, Moore finished with 17 receptions for 301 receiving yards and two receiving touchdowns. He re-signed with Seattle on a one-year contract on April 22, 2020.

During the Seahawks' Week 2 game against the New England Patriots in 2020, Moore caught an improbable 38-yard touchdown on the sideline. The catch probability was rated as 6.3%, the lowest since Tyler Lockett's toe-drag reception in 2019 against the Rams.

Carolina Panthers
On March 18, 2021, Moore signed a two-year, $4.75 million dollar contract with the Carolina Panthers. He was released on September 1, 2021.

Las Vegas Raiders
On September 6, 2021, Moore was signed to the Las Vegas Raiders practice squad.

Denver Broncos
On September 28, 2021, Moore was signed by the Denver Broncos off the Raiders practice squad. He was released on October 19, 2021, and re-signed to the practice squad. He was released on November 9.

Green Bay Packers
On December 30, 2021, Moore was signed to the Green Bay Packers practice squad. He was elevated to the active roster on January 1, 2022, ahead of a Week 17 game against the Minnesota Vikings.

Chicago Bears
On April 21, 2022, Moore signed a one-year contract with the Chicago Bears. He was placed on injured reserve on August 21, 2022 after suffering a leg injury in practice. He was released on September 17.

NFL career statistics

Regular season

Postseason

References

External links
Chicago Bears bio
ECU Tigers bio

1995 births
Living people
Players of American football from Texas
People from Gainesville, Texas
American football wide receivers
East Central Tigers football players
Seattle Seahawks players
Carolina Panthers players
Las Vegas Raiders players
Denver Broncos players
Green Bay Packers players
Chicago Bears players